Nezpique (tattooed nose) is an unincorporated community in Acadia Parish, Louisiana, United States.

References

Unincorporated communities in Acadia Parish, Louisiana
Unincorporated communities in Louisiana